Brian Arthur Mikkelsen (born 31 January 1966) is CEO of The Danish Chamber of Commerce. He is former Minister and former member of the Conservative People's Party, and was in The Danish Parliament (Folketinget) from 21 September 1994 to 21 June 2018.

Mikkelsen was born in Copenhagen as the son of systems consultant Arne Mikkelsen and receptionist Winnie Mikkelsen.

Political career
Mikkelsen was the Danish Culture Minister from November 2001 to September 2008, Justice Minister from September 2008 to February 2010 and Minister of Economic and Business Affairs from February 2010 to October 2011. He was appointed Minister for Industry, Business and Financial Affairs on 28 November 2016.

Other activities
Mikkelsen has since 2001 been a member of the executive committee of the World Anti-Doping Agency, and he was its vice-president from 2004 to 2006. In his capacity as minister, he also holds the following positions:
 European Bank for Reconstruction and Development (EBRD), Ex-Officio Member of the Board of Governors
 European Investment Bank (EIB), Ex-Officio Member of the Board of Governors
 Nordic Investment Bank (NIB), Ex-Officio Member of the Board of Governors

References

 

1966 births
Danish Justice Ministers
Living people
Danish Culture Ministers
Politicians from Copenhagen
World Anti-Doping Agency members
Members of the Folketing 1994–1998
Members of the Folketing 1998–2001
Members of the Folketing 2001–2005
Members of the Folketing 2005–2007
Members of the Folketing 2007–2011
Members of the Folketing 2011–2015
Members of the Folketing 2015–2019